The Freedom class is a group of three cruise ships for Royal Caribbean International. The first ship of the class, was the largest passenger ship in the world, and the largest ever built in terms of passenger capacity and gross tonnage, when it was built in 2006.

Freedom of the Seas left Aker Finnyards Turku Shipyard, Finland on 24 April 2006 and started regular sailings  out of Miami the next month. The second ship of the class, sailed on its maiden voyage on 19 May 2007. The third ship of the class, was delivered and started work out of Southampton in April 2008.

Design 

The Freedom-class ships are similar in design and layout to the earlier second-generation , including an ice skating rink and a  central atrium named the Royal Promenade, featuring a pub, shops, arcades, bars, and a 24-hour Cafe Promenade. New features added to the Freedom class include the FlowRider surf park, cantilevered whirlpools, a full-size boxing ring, and the H2O Zone waterpark.

The first ship, Freedom of the Seas, is estimated to have cost US$800 million.

Future 
In March 2008, Aker Yards and Royal Caribbean announced a memorandum of agreement for a fourth ship in the class, subject to board approval and finalization of terms and conditions, but no actual order for the ship was ever announced. In 2011, Royal Caribbean announced that it had ordered two ships from the similarly-sized , making an order for a fourth Freedom-class ship unlikely.

Ships

References

External links
 Royal Caribbean webpage for the Freedom class

Cruise ship classes
Royal Caribbean International